Anthony Douglas Jose (17 February 1929 – 3 February 1972), known as Tony Jose, was an Australian cricketer who played for South Australia, Oxford University and Kent County Cricket Club between 1948 and 1953. He was born in Adelaide in South Australia in 1929 and died at Los Angeles in California in 1972 aged 42. 

Jose was educated at Adelaide University and then at Oxford, gaining a doctorate. He played in a total of 29 first-class cricket matches, making his debut for South Australia in January 1948 before playing occasionally for Kent between 1951 and 1952.

References

External links

1929 births
1972 deaths
Australian cricketers
Kent cricketers
South Australia cricketers
Oxford University cricketers
Alumni of Brasenose College, Oxford
Free Foresters cricketers